Mirko Vujačić (1 September 1924 – 2 January 2016) was a Montenegrin athlete. He competed in the men's javelin throw at the 1948 Summer Olympics, representing Yugoslavia.

References

1924 births
2016 deaths
Athletes (track and field) at the 1948 Summer Olympics
Montenegrin male javelin throwers
Olympic athletes of Yugoslavia